Minawa Dam is a gravity dam located in Tokushima prefecture in Japan. The dam is used for power production. The catchment area of the dam is 850.1 km2. The dam impounds about 7  ha of land when full and can store 299 thousand cubic meters of water. The construction of the dam was started on 1957 and completed in 1959.

References

Dams in Tokushima Prefecture
1959 establishments in Japan